Kim Jae-hwi (Hangul: 김재휘; born  in Seoul) is a South Korean male volleyball player. He is part of the South Korea men's national volleyball team. On club level he plays for the Cheonan Hyundai Capital Skywalkers.

Career

Clubs
In the 2015 V-League Draft, Kim was selected second overall by the Hyundai Capital Skywalkers.

In the 2016–17 season, Kim won his first championship, helping the Skywalkers clinch their third V-League title.

National team
In 2011 Kim joined the South Korean national under-19 team for the 2011 FIVB World Youth (U19) Championship, where his team finished in 14th place.

In July 2017 Kim first got called up to the South Korean senior national team for  the 2017 Asian Championship, where South Korea won the bronze medal.

External links
 Kim Jae-hwi at the International Volleyball Federation (FIVB)

1993 births
Living people
South Korean men's volleyball players
Asian Games silver medalists for South Korea
Asian Games medalists in volleyball
Medalists at the 2018 Asian Games
Volleyball players at the 2018 Asian Games
21st-century South Korean people